Colpodium is a genus of plants in the grass family, native primarily to Asia but with a few species on certain mountains in Africa.

 Species
 Colpodium altaicum Trin. ex Ledeb. - Altai Mountains (Altai Krai, Xinjiang, Mongolia, Kazakhstan)
 Colpodium araraticum (Lipsky) Woronow ex Grossh. - Turkey, Armenia
 Colpodium baltistanicum Dickore -  Jammu-Kashmir
 Colpodium chionogeiton (Pilg.) Tzvelev  - Kenya, Tanzania
 Colpodium colchicum (Albov) Woronow ex Grossh. - Circassia, Turkey
 Colpodium drakensbergense Hedberg & I.Hedberg - KwaZulu-Natal, Lesotho
 Colpodium fibrosum Trautv. - northeastern Turkey
 Colpodium gillettii Bor - Iraq
 Colpodium hedbergii (Melderis) Tzvelev - Ethiopia, Kenya, Tanzania, South Africa
 Colpodium himalaicum (Hook.f.) Bor -  Jammu-Kashmir
 Colpodium humile (M.Bieb.) Griseb. - Xinjiang, Siberia, Kazakhstan, Uzbekistan, Kyrgyzstan
 Colpodium lakium Woronow - Dagestan
 Colpodium lanatiflorum (Roshev.) Tzvelev - Siberia
 Colpodium nutans (Stapf) Bor 	 - Uttarakhand, Jammu-Kashmir, Himachal Pradesh
 Colpodium oreades (Peter) E.B.Alexeev - Mount Kilimanjaro in Tanzania
 Colpodium parviflorum Boiss. & Buhse  - Iran, Turkey, Caucasus
 Colpodium ponticum (Balansa) Woronow - Turkey
 Colpodium tibeticum Bor - Tibet, Bhutan, Nepal
 Colpodium variegatum (Boiss.) Boiss. ex Griseb.  - Iran, Turkey
 Colpodium versicolor (Steven) Schmalh. - Iran, Iraq, Turkey, Caucasus
 Colpodium violaceum (Boiss.) Griseb. - Iran, Iraq
 Colpodium wallichii (Hook.f.) Bor - Nepal, Sikkim

 formerly included 
see Arctagrostis Arctophila Catabrosa Dupontia Festuca Hyalopoa Muhlenbergia Periballia Phippsia Poa Puccinellia Pucciphippsia Sporobolus

References

 
Poaceae genera
Taxonomy articles created by Polbot